The Cempaka mine is one of the largest diamond mines in Indonesia and in the world. The mine is located in South Kalimantan, Borneo. The mine has estimated reserves of 32.9 million carats of diamonds.
  

The hundreds hoping for fortune at Indonesia's largest diamond mine

1.2k Share  Tweet  
BY VICTORIA HOSingapore
Nov 09, 2015
For the 500 or so miners that toil at the Cempaka mine, Indonesia's largest diamond producer, each day provides hope that one of them will find the next massive rare diamond there.

Cempaka is in South Kalimantan in Indonesia, and has provided some huge finds for miners in the past. In 2006, a 3.02 carat blue diamond was discovered, and it was rare enough that its UK-based owner, BDI Mining, thought it was important enough to announce to shareholders.

But it's still dwarfed by 1965's find of a 166 carat gem that was nearly the size of a pigeon's egg. The Trisakti diamond, as it was later named, was sold off at auction.
Ulet Ifansasti, an Indonesian photographer who went down to the mine to shoot for Getty Images, told Mashable that he met miners aged 17 to 70 at the site. One of the oldest miners told him he had been working there for the past 50 years, in hopes of finding the next Trisakti.

But the life of a diamond miner can be fraught with danger, Ifansasti pointed out. 400 of them have died at Cempaka since 2000 due to landslides caused by soil erosion from digging. "From the top it looks like the moon," he said, of the numerous craters made at the site.

There are also disputes over territory, said Ifansasti. The workers are freelance, not hired by BDI (now owned by LSE-listed Gem Diamonds), and head to the mine in groups of ten to stake out spots with potential. Groups of miners which dig in competitors' spots have come to clashes before, and people have been killed in the conflicts, he said.

"It's open to all, everybody can go (to the mine), and workers, they fight for the land," he said.
Cempaka's mine is located near to the Martapura city center, which has become a tourist attraction for its numerous shops carrying diamonds at purported bargains. Kalimantan has had several diamond mines since the 18th century when it was under Dutch rule.

Cempaka owner BDI Mining, now owned by LSE-listed Gem Diamonds, started mining operations there in 2005, and in a year had uncovered 50,000 carats of "gem quality" diamonds, it said in a statement.

References 

Diamond mines in Indonesia

The hundreds hoping for fortune at Indonesia's largest diamond mine
http://mashable.com/2015/11/09/campaka-indonesia-diamond-mine/#5XrLagnkdEqk